is the fourteenth compilation album by Japanese singer Shizuka Kudo. It was released on March 9, 2016, through Pony Canyon. It features three discs-worth of songs co-written by lyricist Gorō Matsui,  ranging from Kudo's greatest hit singles to album tracks to recent compositions. The record also includes the unreleased track "Without Your Love" as well as a new song entitled "Yuragi no Tsuki".

Background
My Heartful Best: Gorō Matsui Collection is a compilation album featuring songs with lyrics written by Gorō Matsui released throughout Kudo's career. It includes a total of twenty-eight songs, from the late eighties all the way up to newly recorded material. On the first disc, dubbed "Bloom", the last track, "Whitout Your Love", is a previous recorded song that is being released for the first time. It was penned by Matsui and composed by Tsugutoshi Gotō. The song was originally recorded in 1993 and was in contention to be released as a single, instead of the song "Anata Shika Inai Desho", but the idea was shelved. During the album's promotion, Kudo performed the song on the EX music show Music Station, marking her first appearance on the program in fourteen years. A new song was also recorded for the compilation, titled "Yuragi no Tsuki", and included on the third disc, dubbed "Crescent". The song is written by Matsui and composed by Toshiaki Matsumoto. "Yuragi no Tsuki" was used as ending theme to the TBS morning show Hiruobi! to promote the album.

Commercial performance
My Heartful Best: Gorō Matsui Collection entered the daily Oricon Albums Chart at number 21, where it also peaked. It debuted on the weekly chart at number 38, selling 2,000 copies. The album charted for four consecutive weeks in the top 300, selling a reported total 3,000 of copies.

Track listing
All lyrics written by Gorō Matsui.

Charts

References

External links
 My Heartful Best: Gorō Matsui Collection on Kudo's official website

2016 compilation albums
Shizuka Kudo albums
Pony Canyon compilation albums